Live Laugh Love is the debut EP released by Stockholm-based post-hardcore band Urma Sellinger in 2010. The EP was recorded in 2010 together with Matt Hyde at Bro Studio in London, England and Lunatic Music in Gävle, Sweden.

Live Laugh Love features three tracks titled "Good Times", "Far from Sandra" and "Rise to the Challenges That Life Presents You". The last two songs are also included on the band's self-titled debut album Urma Sellinger, which was released on January 26, 2012.

Track listing

Credits 
Urma Sellinger
 Olle Johansson  – vocals
 Alex Borg – vocals
 Eric Lindqvist – guitar
 Andree Borg – guitar
 John Eriksson – drums
 Axel Vålvik – bass guitar

Production
 Matt Hyde – producing, mixing, engineering

References

External links 
 Live Laugh Love at Spirit of Metal webzine

2010 EPs
Urma Sellinger EPs